Sleeping With the Enemy is the second studio album by American rapper Paris. Released on November 24, 1992, it stimulated much controversy with the songs "Bush Killa" (a revenge fantasy about the assassination of then-president George H. W. Bush) and "Coffee, Donuts & Death" (a cop-killing tirade). It also featured a young DJ Shadow on production.

Originally scheduled for a pre–presidential election release in 1992, the album was eventually released on Paris' own Scarface Records after Time Warner shareholders and media pressure prevented then-Warner Bros. Records subsidiary Tommy Boy Records from releasing the project.

It was re-released in a limited release subtitled The Deluxe Edition; it was digitally enhanced, reworked, and contains alternate versions. The album sold over 480,000 copies.

Track listing 
 "The Enema (Live At The White House)"
 "Make Way for a Panther"
 "Sleeping with the Enemy"
 "House Niggas Bleed Too"
 "Bush Killa"
 "Coffee, Doughnuts, & Death"
 "Thinka 'Bout It"
 "Guerrillas in the Mist"
 "The Days of Old"
 "Long Hot Summer"
 "Conspiracy of Silence" feat. LP and Son Doobiest
 "Funky Li'l Party"
 "Check it out, Ch'all"
 "Rise"
 "Assata's Song"
 "Bush Killa" (Hellraiser Mix)

Personnel
 D.J. Yon: Scratches on "Coffee, Doughnuts, and Death"
 Eric Bertaud: Saxophone on "Assata's Song"
 Victor Hall: Photography
 J. Alex: Graphics
 Mike Martin: Engineering and production assistance

Samples
"Guerrillas in the Mist"
"UFO" by ESG (sirens)
"No Vaseline" by Ice Cube
"Assata's Song"
"The Humpty Dance" by Digital Underground
"Coffee, Donuts & Death"
"It's All the Way Live" by Lakeside
"Atomic Dog" by George Clinton
"Long Hot Summer"
"Hot Dawgit" by Ramsey Lewis
"Make Way for a Panther"
"Life Could" by Rotary Connection
"Son of Scorpio" by Dennis Coffey
"Rigor Mortis" by Cameo
"Sleeping With the Enemy"
"Take Me to the Mardi Gras" by Bob James
"Welcome to the Terrordome" by Public Enemy
"The Days of Old"
"The Jam" by Graham Central Station
"Mysterious Vibes" by The Blackbyrds
"Thinka 'Bout It"
"Outstanding" by The Gap Band
"Check It Out Ch'all"
"Sing a Simple Song" by Sly & the Family Stone
"Bush Killa"
"Run, N*****" by The Last Poets
"Atomic Dog" by George Clinton

References

External links 
Sleeping With The Enemy entry on
Sleeping With The Enemy review
Sleeping With The Enemy album review

1992 albums
Paris (rapper) albums
Self-released albums
Albums produced by DJ Shadow
Political music albums by American artists